Antonio Tizzano (born 1940) is a former judge at the European Court of Justice. He served as its Vice-President from October 2015 until October 2018.

He was the Advocate General at the European Court of Justice from 7 October 2000 to 3 May 2006; he had been a Judge at the European Court of Justice since 4 May 2006. He is a professor of European Union Law at La Sapienza University, Rome, and a member of the independent group of experts appointed to examine the finances of the Commission of the European Communities (1999).

On 8 October 2015 he was elected Vice-President of the European Court of Justice.

See also

List of members of the European Court of Justice

References 

1940 births
Living people
Academic staff of the Sapienza University of Rome
Advocates General of the European Court of Justice
European Court of Justice judges
Vice-Presidents of the European Court of Justice
Italian judges of international courts and tribunals
Italian officials of the European Union